John Parsons (1868 – March 18, 1949) was a businessman, ship's captain and political figure in Newfoundland. He represented Bay Roberts in the Newfoundland and Labrador House of Assembly from 1928 to 1932 as a Liberal.

He was born in Bay Roberts, the son of James Parsons and Ellen King, and was educated there. Parsons married Susannah Calpin. He operated a wholesale-retail business in the Bay Roberts area and also captained ships operating in the seal fishery. He opposed union with Canada. Parsons joined the opposition Conservatives in 1932 after Squires was accused of corruption. He did not run for reelection in 1932.

References 
 

Members of the Newfoundland and Labrador House of Assembly
1868 births
1949 deaths
Dominion of Newfoundland politicians
People from Bay Roberts